The Journal of Pediatric Ophthalmology and Strabismus is a bimonthly peer-reviewed publication for pediatric ophthalmologists. The journal publishes articles regarding eye disorders in pediatric individuals and the treatment of strabismus in all age groups.

History
The journal was established as a quarterly journal in 1964.  The current editors-in-chief are Rudolph S. Wagner and Leonard B. Nelson.

Abstracting and indexing
The journal is abstracted and indexed in:

According to the Journal Citation Reports, the journal has a 2017 impact factor of 0.979.

References

External links

Monthly journals
English-language journals
Ophthalmology journals
Pediatrics journals